Irénée-Marie Ecological Reserve (French: Réserve écologique Irénée-Marie) is an ecological reserve in the unorganized territory of Rivière-de-la-Savane, in Mékinac Regional County Municipality, in Quebec, Canada. It was established on October 31, 1985.  The Ecological Reserve protects a forest of Eastern white pine, red pine and pine gray.

Toponymy 
The name commemorates Joseph Caron (1889-1960), better known as Brother Irénée-Marie of the Congregation of Christian Brothers, one of the colleagues of brother Marie-Victorin.

Geography 

It is generally formed by rocky slopes and a flat zone.

History
In 1978, private clubs for hunting and fishing were abolished and replaced by zones d'exploitation contrôlée (harvested controlled zones) with the objective to democratise their activities. Consequently, the territory of the reserve was transferred to zec du Chapeau-de-Paille.

The Irenée-Marie ecological reserve was created on October 31, 1985 by a decree of the Quebec Government. It was the 13th ecological reserve to be created in Quebec.

External links

References

Protected areas of Mauricie
Nature reserves in Quebec
Protected areas established in 1985
Mékinac Regional County Municipality
1985 establishments in Quebec